The National Front of Afghanistan (NFA; ; also Afghanistan National Front, ANF), or Jabh-e Melli, was established in late 2011 by Ahmad Zia Massoud, Haji Mohammad Mohaqiq and Abdul Rashid Dostum. It was generally regarded as a reformation of parts of the military wing which once existed  of the United Front (Northern Alliance) which with U.S. air support removed the Taliban from power in Afghanistan in late 2001. The National Front strongly opposed a return of the Taliban to power but failed to keep them in check. It retains only  a small military apparatus today. The chairman of the National Front is Ahmad Zia Massoud, the younger brother of the Northern Alliance leader Ahmad Shah Massoud who was assassinated two days before the September 11 attacks in 2001. It is unclear if it is still in operation, as Afghanistan's Republican government has collapsed.

2001
After the Taliban were removed from power by United Front ground forces and NATO special forces in late 2001, the Shura-e Nazar which more or less had already been replaced by the United Front, dissolved as an organization. Many of its members are still connected and organised within this political party (The National Coalition of Afghanistan).

Berlin Statement
In January 2012, the National Front raised concerns about the possibility of a secretive and untransparent deal between the US, Pakistan and the Taliban during a widely publicized meeting in Berlin. U.S. Congressman Louie Gohmert wrote, "These leaders who fought with embedded Special Forces to initially defeat the Taliban represent over 60-percent of the Afghan people, yet are being entirely disregarded by the Obama and Karzai Administrations in negotiations."

Ahmad Zia Massoud from the Tajik-dominated Jamiat-i Islami, Abdul Rashid Dostum, leader of the Uzbek-dominated Junbish-i Milli; Haji Mohammad Mohaqiq, a leader of the Hazara Hezb-e Wahdat and Amrullah Saleh, former director of the Afghan intelligence service NDS and leader of the newly formed Basij-e Milli (Afghanistan Green Trend) encompassing all ethnic groups, after the meeting with US congressmen in Berlin signed a joint declaration:

The Asia Times writes: 

This is the first time that the leadership of the Tajik, Uzbek and Hazara communities [of Afghanistan] has come to a common line of thinking ... In essence, the Northern Alliance is being resuscitated as a political entity. ... As the Northern Alliance groups see it, Pakistani strategy is to wait out the period between now and 2014 - the date set for the US troop withdrawal - and then regroup the Taliban and make a bid to capture power in Kabul. Their strong show of unity in Berlin suggests that they will not roll over and give way to an exclusive US-Taliban-Pakistan settlement being imposed on their nation.

Countrywide political rallies
Besides incorporating the political parties of the involved leaders, the National Front works in coordination with different Afghan political parties. Among the major political parties that support or work in coordination with the National Front are the National Coalition of Afghanistan led by Abdullah Abdullah, the Basej-e Milli led by Amrullah Saleh, the Nangarhar Shura led by a Pashtun leadership council, the National Congress Party of Afghanistan led by Latif Pedram, and the main Jamiat-e Islami led by Balkh governor Ustad Atta Mohammad Noor.

The National Front has held major political rallies across different provinces in Afghanistan. These rallies were attended by thousands of Afghan citizens. Abdul Rashid Dostum speaking on one of these rallies said that the Taliban were establishing bases in the north of Afghanistan from which to mount attacks after the withdrawal of most international troops in 2014.

The National Front announced it would have a candidate running for the presidential elections in 2014 and emphasized the need for "a transparent and fair election".

See also 
National Resistance Front of Afghanistan
Ahmad Zia Massoud
Haji Mohammad Mohaqiq
Abdul Rashid Dostum
Amrullah Saleh
Ahmad Massoud
Ahmad Shah Massoud
Abdullah Abdullah

References

External links

Yahya Massoud (brother of Ahmad Zia Massoud) / Djeyhoun Ostowar (Jan 12, 2012): Perspectives and prospects of negotiating with the Taliban

Asia Times (Jan 12, 2012): There's more to peace than Taliban

War in Afghanistan (2001–2021)
Islamic political parties in Afghanistan
Islamic democratic political parties
Political parties in Afghanistan